Headspace may refer to:
 Headspace (company), an online healthcare company specializing in meditation
 Headspace (organisation), an Australian non-profit organization for youth mental health
 Headspace or ullage,  the unfilled space in a container
 Headspace technology, the gaseous constituents of a closed space above liquids or solid emitting and vapors measured using headspace gas chromatography
 Headspace (firearms), a chamber measurement
 Headroom (photographic framing), a concept of aesthetic composition in imaging
 Headspace (film), a 2005 horror film
 Head-Space, a 2016 graphic novel

Music
 "Headspace", a song by Velvet Revolver from Contraband
 "Headspace", a song by Lewis Capaldi from Divinely Uninspired to a Hellish Extent
 Headspace (Pulse Ultra album), 2002
 Headspace (Ashton Nyte album), 2005
 Headspace (Issues album), 2016
 Headspace (band), a British progressive metal band formed in 2006